Rumatha jacumba is a species of snout moth in the genus Rumatha. It was described by Herbert H. Neunzig in 1997. It is found in North America, including California and Nevada.

References

Moths described in 1997
Phycitinae